Santiago Martín Prado (born 21 March 1955), sometimes known as Pradito, is a Spanish retired footballer who played as a midfielder, and a manager.

Playing career
Madrid-born Prado was an Atlético Madrid youth graduate, and started playing for the reserves in 1974, with the side in Tercera División. He played the 1976–77 season on loan at CD Eldense in the same category before returning to Atleti.

Prado established himself as a starter during the 1979–80 season, contributing with a career-best 16 goals as his side achieved promotion to Segunda División. He left the club in 1982, after two full seasons in the second tier.

Coaching career
Prado returned to Atleti in 1994, after being named manager of their farm team CP Amorós. After achieving promotion to the fourth division, he was named in charge of the B-team, and led the club back to the second level in his first season; in his second, however, he was dismissed in November after only four points out of 30.

Prado subsequently managed other clubs in the lower leagues, being in charge of CF Rayo Majadahonda (two stints), Getafe CF, CD Toledo, Talavera CF, CD Leganés and UD San Sebastián de los Reyes. He also managed Atlético B for a second time in the 2002–03 season, but was relieved from his duties in June.

Prado also worked at EF Atlético Casarrubuelos, being in charge of the Cadete A squad between 2014 and 2016.

References

External links

1955 births
Living people
Footballers from Madrid
Spanish footballers
Association football midfielders
Segunda División players
Segunda División B players
Tercera División players
Atlético Madrid B players
CD Eldense footballers
Spanish football managers
Segunda División B managers
Atlético Madrid B managers
CF Rayo Majadahonda managers
Getafe CF managers
CD Toledo managers
CD Leganés managers